Nkechi Egbe  (born 5 February 1978) is a Nigerian former football forward who played for the Nigeria women's national football team at the 2004 Summer Olympics. At the club level, she played for Delta Queens.

See also
 Nigeria at the 2004 Summer Olympics

References

External links
 
 

1978 births
Living people
Nigerian women's footballers
Place of birth missing (living people)
Footballers at the 2000 Summer Olympics
Footballers at the 2004 Summer Olympics
Olympic footballers of Nigeria
Women's association football forwards
Nigeria women's international footballers
1999 FIFA Women's World Cup players
2003 FIFA Women's World Cup players
Delta Queens F.C. players